Irandam Kuththu is a 2020 Indian Tamil-language horror comedy film, written and directed by Santhosh P. Jayakumar and Daniel Annie Pope alongside Meenal Sahu, Akrithi Singh. A spiritual successor to the director's earlier Iruttu Araiyil Murattu Kuththu (2018), the film was released on 14 November 2020 and received mixed to negative reviews both from critics and audiences.

Premise 
Veera and Vasu are two friends who are taken for gays all their lives marry two girls and go to a resort in Bangkok for their honeymoons, where a horny ghost who won't let them in peace until they satisfy

Cast

Production 
Director Santhosh P. Jayakumar announced plans to make a sequel to his earlier Iruttu Araiyil Murattu Kuththu (2018) in October 2019, after his other project, Pulanaivu featuring Arvind Swami, had an extended production break. Santhosh opted to star in the film himself, after other actors expressed their reluctance to be a part of the project owing to its adult theme and the flak faced by the previous film's lead actor Gautham Karthik post-release. Daniel Annie Pope was signed to play a pivotal role, while three new actress, Akriti Singh and Meenal joined the film's shoot in December 2019. The film was shot in late 2019 and early 2020 in locations across Huinan County in China, Bangkok and Chennai. The title of the film was confirmed to be Irandam Kuththu in September 2020.

Music

Soundtrack was composed by S. N. Prasad while score was done by Dharan Kumar.

Marketing 

Following the release of the film's official trailer in October 2020, director Bharathiraja criticised the visuals and theme of the film in an open letter. In reply, Santhosh called out the director for being hypocritical citing examples of glamorous stills from Bharathiraja's Tik Tik Tik (1981) before revoking his response and apologising.

A public interest litigation petition was sought to stop the release of the film, citing the film was propagating vulgarity, obscenity and pornography. while the media promotions were being misused for the purpose of commercial benefit. As a result, although the film was allowed to release, the Madurai Bench of Madras High Court ordered the producers to remove the teaser and trailer from YouTube.

Release

Theatrical
Irandam Kuththu was released on 14 November 2020 across theatres in Tamil Nadu, becoming the first film release in over eight months owing to the COVID-19 pandemic. Prior to the release, barring the legal dispute on the film's adult content, it also faced potential delays as result of a dispute between the Tamil Film Active Producers Association (TFAPA) and Qube, a digital service provider. Likewise, as a result of a decision by newspapers to increase advertising, the makers opted to promote the film through online and physical posters only.

Reception

Critical response 

A reviewer from The Times of India gave the film one star out of five, noting "if the plot follows the template set by the first film, everything else sinks to lower depths than what we witnessed in that one." The critic from Cinema Express gave the film the same score, noting "Irandam Kuththu lacks the necessary horror or the comedy elements and resorts to sexual innuendos as the only weapon to tickle your funny bones", concluding it was "a hideously unfunny and unoriginal fiasco". Sify's reviewer also gave the film one star, writing the film was "a below average adult horror-comedy".

Karthik Keramalu of Film Companion, wrote, "The sex comedy, which is streaming on Amazon Prime Video, is a bore-fest in three tragic acts."

References

External links 
 

2020s Tamil-language films
2020 films
2020 comedy horror films
Films shot in Chennai
Indian comedy horror films
Films scored by S. N. Prasad
Films scored by Dharan Kumar
Indian sex comedy films